Mohamed Ibrahim (born 4 August 1942) is an Egyptian gymnast. He competed in eight events at the 1964 Summer Olympics.

References

1942 births
Living people
Egyptian male artistic gymnasts
Olympic gymnasts of Egypt
Gymnasts at the 1964 Summer Olympics
Place of birth missing (living people)